"Tick Tick Boom" is a single by Swedish rock band The Hives, released in 2007. It is the opening track to The Black and White Album and is the first single taken from that album. "Tick Tick Boom" was released on 8 October 2007.

The song was voted in at number 99 in the Triple J Hottest 100 of 2007.

Music video
Two music videos exist for this song. The video directed by Kalle Haglund stars the Hives as giant statues in Stockholm's Liljevalchs konsthall who eventually destroy the museum on the song's final "Boom". In the video, the Hives fashion suits with white dress shoes. The second version is of a staged live performance of the song, part of which was displayed in the Nike / Finish Line commercial.

In popular culture
In 2017, the song was featured in Codemasters game, Dirt 4.
The song was once the goal song for Vancouver Canucks defenseman Alex Edler in the 2015–16 NHL season, as the Canucks began using player-specific goal songs.
The song received a large exposure to American audiences, appearing in several TV shows, documentaries, video games and films including Baby Driver, CSI: Miami, Friday Night Lights, Jumper, Taken, Friday the 13th, MacGruber, The Heat, 30 Minutes or Less, The Nut Job 2, Warren Miller's Playground and Dirt 4, Guitar Hero: Warriors of Rock, Madden NFL 08 and Madden NFL 11, Forza Motorsport 3, MotorStorm: Arctic Edge, NCAA Football 10, Back 4 Blood and Lego Rock Band.
The song has also appeared in trailers and commercials for Get Smart, Get Smart's Bruce and Lloyd: Out of Control, Overstrike (later rebranded as Fuse), Fox Sports 1, Spy Kids: All the Time in the World,, Lego Marvel Superheroes 2 and Suicide Squad: Kill the Justice League.
WWE used the song to serve as the theme song for the 2007 PPV event, Survivor Series.
In 2009, ESPN used the song in a video package highlighting the moments of the decade in NCAA football.

Track listing

European 7"
"Tick Tick Boom"
"Hell No"
Includes exclusive signed poster

US 7"
"Tick Tick Boom"
"Square One Here I Come"

European CD
"Tick Tick Boom"
"Waits Too Long"

US CD
"Tick Tick Boom"
"Waits Too Long"
"Fall Is Just Something Grownups Invented"

Charts

References

External links

The Hives songs
2007 singles
Song recordings produced by Jacknife Lee
2007 songs
A&M Octone Records singles
Polydor Records singles